The 1804 United States presidential election in New York took place between November 2 and December 5, 1804, as part of the 1804 United States presidential election. The state legislature chose 19 representatives, or electors to the Electoral College, who voted for President and Vice President.

During this election, New York cast 19 electoral votes for Democratic Republican incumbent Thomas Jefferson.

See also
 United States presidential elections in New York

References

New York
1804
1804 New York (state) elections